2001 was dominated by the September 11 attacks against the United States by Al-Qaeda, which killed 2,977 people and instigated the global war on terror. The United States led a multi-national coalition in an invasion of Afghanistan after the Taliban government did not extradite Al-Qaeda leader Osama bin Laden. 

Internal conflicts, political or otherwise, caused shifts in leadership in multiple countries, which included the assassination of Laurent-Désiré Kabila in the Democratic Republic of the Congo, the Second EDSA Revolution in the Philippines, the massacre of the royal family by the crown prince in Nepal, and civil unrest in Argentina. Other notable political events were an escalation in the Israeli–Palestinian conflict, the storming of the Indonesian parliament, the Hainan Island incident between China and the United States, an insurgency in Macedonia, and a terrorist attack on the Parliament of India that began the 2001–2002 India–Pakistan standoff.

Space milestones in 2001 were numerous, the most notable being the first spacecraft landing on an asteroid, the deorbit of the Russian station Mir, American entrepreneur Dennis Tito becoming the first space tourist, the discovery of 28978 Ixion in the Kuiper belt, a flyby of Io by the U.S. Galileo probe, and the first discovery of an atmosphere on an exoplanet. In addition, the year witnessed the first sequence of the human genome, the first self-contained artificial heart, and the first clone of a human embryo.

2001 was designated as International Year of Volunteers by the United Nations.

Health and society 
The world population on January 1, 2001, was estimated to be 6.190 billion people, and it increased to 6.272 billion people by January 1, 2002. The average global life expectancy was 66.8 years, an increase of 0.3 years from 2000. The rate of child mortality was 7.58%, a decrease of 0.26% from 2000. 28.25% of people were living in extreme poverty, a decrease of 0.88% from 2000.

The number of global refugees in 2001 was approximately 12 million. 500,000 were settled over the course of the year, but the same number of people were displaced in other locations, causing the number of refugees to remain largely unchanged. The largest sources of refugees were from Afghanistan and Macedonia. The number of internally displaced persons decreased from 21.8 million to 19.8 million in 2001, with the most affected areas being Afghanistan, Colombia, and Liberia.

The World Health Organization (WHO) recognized mental health as its health concern of focus in the 2001 World Health Report. The WHO also began a five-year program to reduce road injury fatalities following a warning of the problem's severity by the Red Cross the previous year. The WHO's Commission on Macroeconomics and Health released a report in 2001 detailing how spending by developed nations could protect health in developing nations but that efforts to do so were impeded by the anti-globalization movement.

2001 was designated as International Year of Volunteers by the United Nations.

Health incidents 
An ebola outbreak continued from 2000 in Uganda until the final case was diagnosed on January 16. Another outbreak occurred in Gabon and the Republic of the Congo in October, which would continue until July 2002. An outbreak of foot-and-mouth disease occurred in the United Kingdom in 2001, beginning on February 19. It affected thousands of farm animals and prompted the killing of millions of animals to contain the outbreak. The largest ever recorded outbreak of Legionnaires' disease occurred in July in Murcia, Spain. 449 cases were confirmed, with more than 800 suspected ones.

Approximately 400,000 people in New York City were exposed to air pollution by carcinogens and other harmful particles such as asbestos and metals as a result of the September 11 attacks, and many would go on to suffer chronic illness as a result of exposure.

Conflicts

Internal conflicts 
The Battle of Tetovo was the first major offensive of the insurgency, launched by the NLA on March 14. Tetovo would remain a major area of conflict for the duration of the insurgency. Attempts to reach a ceasefire were interrupted in June. The Ohrid Agreement was signed on August 13, and the deployment of NATO peacekeeping forces to Macedonia was authorized on August 21. In Yugoslavia, the related insurgency in the Preševo Valley by Albanian rebels escalated on February 5. The Končulj Agreement, signed in May, mandated a ceasefire and resulted in the full demilitarization, demobilization, and disarmament of the Liberation Army of Preševo, Medveđa and Bujanovac (UÇPMB).

The Second Congo War continued with the assassination of President Laurent-Désiré Kabila on January 16. The Angolan Civil War moved toward peace talks in 2001, but talks were challenged by attacks on civilians by UNITA, including a train bombing on August 10 that killed 252 people. The insurgency following the Second Chechen War continued in Chechnya, prompting Russia to respond with the Alkhan-Kala operation on June 25. The War of the Peters continued into 2001 as a conflict between two commanders within the larger Second Sudanese Civil War, going on until a ceasefire was negotiated in August. The Bandaranaike Airport attack was a deadly attack by the Tamil Tigers that took place as part of the ongoing Eelam War III in Sri Lanka. The Provisional Irish Republican Army began disarmament in October following decades of paramilitary attacks during the Troubles.

Two failed coup attempts took place in 2001: a group of junior officers sought to overthrow President Pierre Buyoya in Burundi while he was out of the country on April 18, and André Kolingba, a former president of the Central African Republic, led a military coup against his successor Ange-Félix Patassé on May 28, causing several days of violence.

International conflicts 
The Second Intifada marked increased conflict between Israel and Palestine in 2001 when terrorists affiliated with Hamas carried out several suicide bombings and other attacks on Israeli citizens. The Israeli government responded with temporary occupations, targeted killings, and its first use of airstrikes against Palestine since 1967. The Israeli and Palestinian governments agreed to a ceasefire on September 19.

Border clashes occurred between Bangladesh and India in April. The 2001–2002 India–Pakistan standoff began on December 13 after an attack on the Parliament of India by Pakistani militants. Enforcement of the Iraqi no-fly zones led to air strikes against Iraq in February and August by the United States and the United Kingdom.

September 11 attacks and War in Afghanistan 

The September 11 attacks were committed against the United States by Al-Qaeda when 19 terrorists hijacked four commercial airplanes and crashed two of them into the Twin Towers of the World Trade Center, one into the Pentagon, and one in a field in Stonycreek Township, Pennsylvania. 2,977 people were killed, and the subsequent global war on terror made the attacks one of the events that defined 2001. The United States demanded that the Taliban extradite Al-Qaeda leader Osama bin Laden and end state-sponsored terrorism in Afghanistan. When these demands were not met, the United States led a multi-national coalition in the invasion of Afghanistan on October 7, entering into the ongoing Afghan Civil War.

The first major offensive was won by American and Northern Alliance forces during the Fall of Mazar-i-Sharif on November 10. The Northern Alliance took control of the city of Herat during an uprising on November 12, and Al-Qaeda surrendered the Afghan capital Kabul to the Northern Alliance on November 13. The Taliban surrendered in Kandahar on December 6. The United States and its allies attacked the Al-Qaeda headquarters in Tora Bora in December, but Osama bin Laden escaped by the time the cave complex was captured by the forces on December 17. An interim government of Afghanistan led by Hamid Karzai was formed on December 22.

Culture

Architecture and art 

Museums that opened in 2001 include the Ghibli Museum in Tokyo, the Neue Galerie New York, the Jewish Museum Berlin, and the Leopold Museum in Vienna. The Kodak Theatre opened in Hollywood in November 2001, constructed to host the Academy Awards. The Leaning Tower of Pisa reopened to the public on December 15 after 12 years of reconstruction.

Several iconic works of photojournalism were produced during the September 11 attacks, including The Falling Man and Raising the Flag at Ground Zero. The Sphere was one of many artworks damaged during the attacks. It was the only one to be recovered, and the sculpture continued to be displayed in its damaged form as a memorial.

Media 

The highest-grossing films in 2001 were Harry Potter and the Philosopher's Stone, The Lord of the Rings: The Fellowship of the Ring, and Monsters, Inc. The highest-grossing non-English film was Studio Ghibli's anime Spirited Away (Japanese), which was the 15th highest-grossing film of the year. The inaugural entries of the Harry Potter and Lord of the Rings film franchises prompted a shift in both the film and literary communities by propelling fantasy into mainstream culture, popularizing young adult novels, and reforming the blockbuster to promote film franchises and cater to fandom communities.

In music, 3.2 billion units were sold with a value of US$33.7 billion. DVD-Audio and Super Audio CD first rose to prominence in 2001, with approximately 600 titles available in these formats. Portable music grew in popularity after Apple Inc. released the iTunes media library on January 9 and the first iPod music player device on October 23. Worldwide, the best-selling albums were Hybrid Theory (2000) by Linkin Park, No Angel (1999) by Dido, and Survivor (2001) by Destiny's Child. The best-selling non-English album was Cieli di Toscana (2001) by Italian tenor Andrea Bocelli, which topped the charts in the Netherlands and Sweden and was the 23rd best-selling album globally.

The year 2001 is considered important in the video game industry, partly because of the release of many games recognized as classics. Many video games released in 2001 defined or redefined their respective genres, including hack and slash game Devil May Cry, first-person shooter game Halo: Combat Evolved, and open world action-adventure game Grand Theft Auto III, which is regarded as an industry-defining work.

In addition, the GameCube and the Game Boy Advance (Nintendo), and the Xbox (Microsoft) were Three major video game systems were released in 2001: the GameCube and the Game Boy Advance by Nintendo, and the Xbox by Microsoft. were major new video gaming systems released in this year. Meanwhile, Sega ended its involvement in the market after the failure of the Dreamcast. 

Bratz, an American media franchise created by former Mattel employee Carter Bryant for MGA Entertainment, released its new line of fashion dolls  on May 21.

Sports 

NASCAR driver Dale Earnhardt, described as the greatest driver in the sport's history, died in a crash during the 2001 Daytona 500 on February 18. The World Wrestling Federation agreed to purchase its largest rival, World Championship Wrestling, on March 23. In April, golf player Tiger Woods became the only player to achieve a "Tiger Slam" after winning the 2001 Masters Tournament, in which he consecutively won all four championship golf titles outside of a single calendar year. The world record for largest victory in an international football match was set by Australia in a 0–22 victory against Tonga on April 9. Australia set this record again with a 31–0 victory against American Samoa on April 11. The unbalanced nature of these matches prompted changes to the FIFA qualification process. The "Thunder in Africa" boxing match ended in a major upset after Hasim Rahman defeated champion Lennox Lewis on April 22. Lewis would go on to win a rematch on November 11.

Disasters

Accidents 
Two major crowd crushes took place at sporting events in 2001. 43 people were killed during the Ellis Park Stadium disaster on April 11 in Johannesburg, South Africa, caused by overcrowding, and 126 people were killed in the Accra Sports Stadium disaster on May 9 in Ghana, during an ongoing sports riot. 

Major structural failures in 2001 included the collapse of the Hintze Ribeiro Bridge in Portugal on March 4, killing approximately 70 people, and the collapse of a wedding hall on May 24 in Jerusalem, Israel, killing 23 people. 44 people were killed in a building fire, the fifth-deadliest in post-war Japanese history, on September 1 in Shinjuku, Tokyo, Japan. 31 people were killed when a fertilizer factory exploded on September 21 in Toulouse, France. The explosion was caused by a chemical spill amid unsafe storage practices. At least 291 people were killed in Lima, Peru, on December 29 after a firework accident caused a fire in a shopping center.

The deadliest rail accidents in 2001 include a collision that killed at least 30 people at Nvoungouti in the Republic of the Congo on January 12, a train derailment over a bridge that killed 59 people in Kadalundi, India, on June 22, and two accidents in Indonesia: a collision that killed 31 people in Jakarta on September 2, and a collision that killed 42 people at the Ketanggungan Barat railway station on December 25. The deadliest aircraft accidents in 2001 include a Vladivostok Air crash at International Airport Irkutsk, Russia, which killed 145 people on July 4, a collision at Linate Airport in Milan, Italy, which killed 118 people on October 8, and an American Airlines crash in Queens, New York City, which killed 265 people on November 12.

Natural disasters 

There were four earthquakes in 2001 that caused significant casualties. El Salvador was struck by two of them: a 7.6-magnitude earthquake on January 13 and a 6.6-magnitude earthquake on February 13, which resulted in the deaths of at least 944 and 315 people respectively. A 7.7-magnitude earthquake in Gujarat, India, on January 26 killed between 13,805 and 20,023 people, and destroyed nearly 340,000 buildings. An 8.4-magnitude earthquake, then the strongest that had occurred globally since 1965, killed at least 77 people in Peru on June 23. A 7.8-magnitude earthquake struck China with an epicenter near Kokoxili, close to the border between Qinghai and Xinjiang, on November 14, but it occurred in a sparsely populated mountainous region and there were no casualties.

The 2001 Atlantic hurricane season was slightly more active than normal, including 15 tropical storms and hurricanes. The deadliest storms were Tropical Storm Allison in June, Hurricane Iris in October, and Hurricane Michelle in November. All three of these storms had their names retired by the World Meteorological Organization. Tropical Storm Allison was the deadliest tropical storm to hit the United States without reaching hurricane strength. The 2001 Pacific typhoon season was slightly larger than average, including 28 tropical storms, 20 typhoons, and 11 intense typhoons. The most powerful storms were Typhoon Podul in October and Typhoon Faxai in December.

Economy 

A minor economic decline took place among many developed economies in 2001. The United States saw a recession from March to November after a correction of the dot-com bubble, an over-valued tech industry. Further economic disruption occurred in the aftermath of the September 11 attacks. European economies also saw stalled growth in 2001, with Germany entering a brief recession toward the end of the year. Argentina's years-long economic crisis reached its peak in December when a bank run prompted the freezing of deposits, in turn causing widespread social unrest and the resignation of the President of Argentina. Overall, 2001 marked a decline in international trade by about 1.5%, which was a significant contrast from the 11% increase in 2000. This was the first negative growth in international trade since 1982. IT industries and the dot-com crash are attributed for the decline in trade.

Greece became the 12th country to join the Eurozone on January 1. America Online (AOL), a U.S. online service provider, was at the apex of its popularity and purchased the media conglomerate Time Warner. The deal took effect on January 11, in the largest merger in history at that time. AOL would rapidly shrink thereafter, partly due to the decline of dial-up and rise of broadband, and the deal would fall apart before the end of the decade, which would be regarded as one of the world's greatest business failures. The Enron scandal took place in October 2001 when Enron Corporation, an American energy company based in Houston, Texas, was found to be committing fraud, bringing about the criminal conviction of several executives and causing the company to undergo the largest bankruptcy at that point in U.S. history. The national airlines of Belgium and Switzerland (Sabena and Swissair, respectively) ended operations in 2001.

Politics 
Freedom House recognized 63% of national governments as electoral democracies by the end of 2001, with the Gambia and Mauritania being recognized as democracies following peaceful transfers of power. Peru also saw a significant expansion of civil rights, emerging from the authoritarian rule of Alberto Fujimori. Argentina, Liberia, Trinidad and Tobago, and Zimbabwe underwent significant democratic backsliding in 2001, with Liberia and Zimbabwe recognized as authoritarian governments by the end of the year. 64.65% of the world's population lived in countries that generally respected human rights, while 35.35% lived in countries that denied political rights and civil liberties.

Islamic terrorism became the predominant global political concern amidst the September 11 attacks and the War on Terror. Islamic extremism was identified as a major threat to democracy and human rights, both in the Muslim world through the implementation of Islamism and in the rest of the world through terrorism.

Domestic 

The Islamic State of Afghanistan was the de jure government of Afghanistan in 2001, but for several years it had operated as a government in exile while the Taliban-led Islamic Emirate of Afghanistan held de facto control over most of the country. Despite pleas from the international community to spare them, the Taliban proceeded to destroy the Buddhas of Bamiyan starting on March 2, having declared that they are idols. The Islamic State of Afghanistan was restored to power following the invasion of Afghanistan with the appointment of president Hamid Karzai on December 22.

The Second EDSA Revolution took place in the Philippines in January. Protests amid a corruption scandal and the resulting impeachment of President Joseph Estrada caused the president to announce his resignation, and he was succeeded by Vice President Gloria Macapagal Arroyo on January 20. A self-immolation incident took place in Tiananmen Square in central Beijing, China, on January 23. Five members of the Falun Gong, a religious movement banned in mainland China, are alleged to have set themselves on fire, but details surrounding the incident are disputed by Falun Gong sources. Thousands of protesters stormed the Indonesian parliament building on January 29. The Argentine great depression escalated with rioting on December 19, prompting President Fernando de la Rúa to resign two days later.

Two former heads of government were arrested in 2001: President Slobodan Milošević of Serbia (1997–2000) was arrested on April 2 for his role in the Srebrenica massacre, and President Carlos Menem of Argentina (1989–1999) was arrested on June 7 for arms trafficking.

Ghana underwent its first peaceful transfer of power since 1979 when John Kufuor was sworn in as President of Ghana on January 7. The Netherlands became the first modern country to legalize same-sex marriage on April 1. The royal family of Nepal was killed on June 1 by Crown Prince Dipendra, who effectively became king upon his father's death. King Dipendra died days later and was succeeded by his uncle Gyanendra. The Constitution of the Comoros was amended on December 24, creating a federal government with a rotating presidency and granting increased autonomy to the three island administrations.

International 

Two major regional organizations were announced in 2001: The African Union was established on May 26 as a pan-African forum to promote unity between African countries, including cooperation in economic and security issues. It would take effect in 2002, replacing the Organisation of African Unity. The Shanghai Cooperation Organisation was announced on June 15 to facilitate political and economic cooperation between Asian countries. Three countries joined the World Trade Organization (WTO) in 2001: Lithuania on May 31, Moldova on July 26, and China on December 11. The WTO began the Doha Development Round in November to negotiate lower trade barriers between countries and integrate developing nations into the global economy.

The Stockholm Convention on Persistent Organic Pollutants was signed on May 22 to limit the production of persistent organic pollutants. The World Conference against Racism 2001 began on August 31, in Durban, South Africa, under the auspices of the United Nations. Israel and the United States withdrew from the conference on September 3 over objections to a draft resolution document equating Zionism with racism and singling out the Jewish state for war crimes. The Aarhus Convention agreement took effect on October 30, establishing the right to environmental information and environmental justice for European and Central Asian countries. The Convention on Cybercrime, the first international treaty to address cybercrime, was signed on November 23.

A diplomatic incident occurred between China and the United States when military planes of the two countries collided on April 1.

Science and technology 

The Human Genome Project released the first draft of its human genome sequence on February 12. The first self-contained artificial heart was implanted on July 2. Several accomplishments were made in the field of cloning in 2001, including the clone of a gaur the clone of a mouflon, and the first clone of a human embryo.

There were only 57 successful orbital spaceflights in 2001, the fewest since 1963. Eight of these launches were crewed missions. Two failed spaceflights also took place. The NEAR Shoemaker made the first successful landing of a spacecraft on an asteroid on February 12. The Mir space station was deorbited and destroyed on March 23. The 2001 Mars Odyssey orbiter was launched on April 7 and arrived at Mars on October 24. American entrepreneur Dennis Tito became the first space tourist on April 28 aboard the Russian Soyuz TM-32. 28978 Ixion was discovered on May 22. The Genesis probe was launched on August 8 to collect solar wind samples.  Deep Space 1 carried out a flyby of Comet Borrelly on September 22, and Galileo carried out a flyby of Io on October 15. An atmosphere was discovered on an exoplanet for the first time on November 27.

Apple Inc. released the Mac OS X operating system for Mac computers on March 24. 3G wireless technology first became available on October 1 when it was adopted by Japanese telecommunications company NTT Docomo. Microsoft released the Windows XP operating system to retail on October 25. The Segway, a self-balancing personal transporter invented by Dean Kamen, was unveiled on December 3 after months of public speculation and media hype, on the ABC News morning program Good Morning America.

Events

January
 January 1 – Greece becomes the 12th country to join the Eurozone.
 January 7 – Ghana undergoes its first peaceful transfer of power since 1979 when John Kufuor is sworn in as President of Ghana.
 January 9 – Apple Inc. launches iTunes, a software program that acts as a media player, media library, and the client app for the iTunes Store.
 January 11 – The merger of AOL and Time Warner, the largest business merger in history at that time, takes effect.
 January 12 – 2001 Nvoungouti train collision: A train collision in the Republic of the Congo kills at least 30 people.
 January 13 – A 7.6-magnitude earthquake hits El Salvador, killing at least 944 people and causing massive landslides, which leaves thousands of those affected homeless.
 January 15 – Wikipedia is launched.
 January 16
 Assassination of Laurent-Désiré Kabila: The President of the Democratic Republic of the Congo is shot in his office during the Second Congo War and rushed to Harare in Zimbabwe for medical treatment; his death will be announced two days later. His son Joseph Kabila will be sworn in as his replacement the following week.
 The final documented case of the 2000–2001 Uganda ebola outbreak is diagnosed.
 January 20
 George W. Bush, a former governor of Texas, is sworn in as the 43rd president of the United States.
 Impeachment proceedings against Philippine President Joseph Estrada end prematurely as he is peacefully overthrown in the Second EDSA Revolution. Vice President Gloria Macapagal Arroyo succeeds him as president.
 January 21 – Taba Summit: Talks between Israel and the Palestinian National Authority begin in Egypt.

 January 22 – The 2001 insurgency in Macedonia begins when a police station is shelled by the National Liberation Army in Tearce, near the border with Kosovo.
 January 23 –  A self-immolation incident takes place in Tiananmen Square in central Beijing, China. Five members of the Falun Gong are alleged to have set themselves on fire, but details surrounding the incident are disputed by Falun Gong sources.
 January 26 – A 7.7  Gujarat earthquake shakes Western India with a maximum Mercalli intensity of X (Extreme), leaving thousands of people dead and more than 166,000 others injured.
 January 29 – Corruption scandals surrounding Indonesian President Abdurrahman Wahid prompt thousands of protesters to storm the Indonesian parliament building.

February
 February 6 – 2001 Israeli prime ministerial election: Ariel Sharon of the Likud party is elected Prime Minister of Israel.
 February 9
 Ehime Maru and USS Greeneville collision: The submarine USS Greeneville accidentally strikes and sinks the Japanese training vessel Ehime Maru near Hawaii, resulting in nine deaths, including several students and teachers.
 2001 Kot Charwal massacre: Militants kill 15 people in their homes in Rajouri, Jammu and Kashmir.

 February 12
 The NEAR Shoemaker spacecraft touches down in the "saddle" region of 433 Eros, a near-Earth object, becoming the first spacecraft to land on an asteroid.
 The Human Genome Project publishes the first draft of its human genome sequence.
 February 13 – A 6.6-magnitude earthquake hits El Salvador, killing at least 315 people.
 February 16 – Iraq disarmament crisis: British and U.S. forces carry out bombing raids to disable Iraq's air defense network.
February 19 – The 2001 United Kingdom foot-and-mouth outbreak begins.
 February 22 – The International Criminal Tribunal for the former Yugoslavia (ICTY) sentences three Bosnian Serb soldiers to prison for wartime sexual violence, recognizing it as a war crime for the first time.
 February 25 – Sampit conflict: Mass ethnic violence begins in Sampit, Indonesia, killing hundreds of people.

March
 March 2 – Despite pleas from the international community to spare them, the Taliban government of Afghanistan begins destroying the Buddhas of Bamiyan, having declared that they are idols.
 March 4 – The Hintze Ribeiro Bridge collapses in northern Portugal, killing 59 people. 
 March 14 – Battle of Tetovo: Violence erupts between Albanian rebels and Macedonian soldiers in Tetovo. Conflict in Tetovo will continue for months during the 2001 insurgency in Macedonia.
 March 16 – Shijiazhuang bombings: 108 people are killed in a series of bombings in Shijiazhuang, China. 
 March 22 – Kenyanthropus is described as an early hominid after the discovery of remains in Kenya. 
 March 23 – The deorbit of Russian space station Mir is processed, with debris falling into the South Pacific Ocean after the station enters the atmosphere and is destroyed.
 March 24 – Apple Inc. released the Mac OS X operating system for Mac computers.
 March 28 – The United States declares its intention to end involvement in the Kyoto Protocol.

April

 April 1
 The Act on the Opening up of Marriage goes into effect in the Netherlands, which becomes the first modern country to legalize same-sex marriage.
 Hainan Island incident: A Chinese fighter jet collides with a U.S. EP-3E surveillance aircraft, which is forced to make an emergency landing in Hainan, China. The U.S. crew is detained for 10 days and the F-8 Chinese pilot, Wang Wei, goes missing and is presumed dead.
 April 2 – Former President of Serbia and Montenegro Slobodan Milošević surrenders to police special forces to be tried on charges of crimes against humanity.
 April 7 – The NASA orbiter 2001 Mars Odyssey launches on a Delta II rocket.
 April 11 – Ellis Park Stadium disaster: 43 people are killed when Ellis Park Stadium is overcrowded.
 April 17
 Nông Đức Mạnh is chosen as General Secretary of the Communist Party of Vietnam.
 Israel occupies an area in the Gaza Strip, killing two people. Israeli forces withdraw the same day after the United States denounces the attack.
 2001 Burundian coup d'état attempt: A group of junior officers make a failed attempt to overthrow President Pierre Buyoya of Burundi.

 April 26
 Junichiro Koizumi becomes the 86th Prime Minister of Japan.
 The Parliament of Ukraine votes to dismiss Prime Minister Viktor Yushchenko.
 April 28
 The Russian spacecraft Soyuz TM-32 lifts off from the Baikonur Cosmodrome in Kazakhstan, carrying the first space tourist, American entrepreneur Dennis Tito, and two Russian cosmonauts.
 Vejce ambush: Eight Macedonian soldiers are killed in an ambush by the NLA near Vejce, a village in the Šar Mountains, Macedonia. It represents the heaviest death toll for the government forces in a single incident during the insurgency.

May
 May 7 – In Banja Luka, Bosnia and Herzegovina, an attempt is made to reconstruct the historic 16th-century Ferhadija Mosque. Serbian nationalists respond with riots and mass violence against Bosnian Muslims.
 May 9 – Accra Sports Stadium disaster: 126 people are killed in a crowd crush in Accra during a sports riot.
 May 13 – The House of Freedoms coalition led by Silvio Berlusconi wins the Italian general election.
 May 18 – 2001 HaSharon Mall suicide bombing: A Hamas suicide bomber kills six people in Netanya, Israel. The Israeli government responds with the first use of airstrikes against Palestine since 1967.
 May 21 – The Končulj Agreement results in the disarmament of the Liberation Army of Preševo, Medveđa and Bujanovac, ending the Insurgency in the Preševo Valley.
 May 22
 28978 Ixion, a large trans-Neptunian object and a possible dwarf planet, is discovered during the Deep Ecliptic Survey.
 The Stockholm Convention on Persistent Organic Pollutants is adopted by 127 countries to limit pollution internationally.
 May 24
 Sherpa Temba Tsheri, 15, becomes the youngest person to reach the summit of Mount Everest.
 The Versailles Wedding Hall collapses in Jerusalem, Israel, killing 23 people and injuring 380 others.
 May 26 – The African Union is formed to replace the Organisation of African Unity. It will begin operation the following year.
 May 28 – 2001 Central African Republic coup d'état attempt: Central African forces led by André Kolingba carry out a failed attempt to overthrow the government of the Central African Republic. Dozens are killed in the ensuing violence.
 May 31
 Lithuania joins the World Trade Organization.
 Research into Crohn's disease confirms that it is identified with mutation of the NOD2 gene.

June
 June 1
 Crown Prince Dipendra of Nepal kills his father, the king, his mother and other members of the royal family with an assault rifle and then shoots himself in the Nepalese royal massacre. Dipendra is recognized as King of Nepal while in a coma. 
 Dolphinarium discotheque massacre: A Hamas suicide bomber kills 21 people, mostly teenagers, in the Dolphinarium disco in Tel Aviv, Israel.
 June 4 – Gyanendra ascends the throne of Nepal on the death of his nephew, Dipendra.

 June 5 – Tropical Storm Allison hits the U.S. state of Texas, severely flooding Houston and killing 23 people.
 June 7
 2001 United Kingdom general election: Tony Blair and the Labour Party win a second landslide victory.
 Former Argentinian president Carlos Menem is arrested on suspicion of illegal arms sales.
 June 12 – Aračinovo crisis: Albanian rebels violate a 24-hour cease fire with Macedonian soldiers.
 June 15 – Declaration to establish the Shanghai Cooperation Organisation is signed.
 June 19
 Syria withdraws thousands of forces from a decades-long military presence in Beirut, Lebanon.
 Germany enacts a program to compensate Holocaust survivors that were subject to slave labor.
 A missile hits a soccer field in northern Iraq, killing 23 people and wounding 11 more. According to U.S. officials, it is an Iraqi missile that malfunctioned.
 June 22 – Kadalundi train derailment: A train derailment in Kadalundi, India kills at least 59 people.
 June 23 – An 8.4  southern Peru earthquake shakes coastal Peru with a maximum Mercalli intensity of VIII (Severe). A destructive tsunami follows, leaving at least 77 people dead, and 2,687 others injured.
 June 25 – Alkhan-Kala operation: Russian forces carry out a zachistka operation in Alkhan-Kala, Grozny, Chechnya, during the Second Chechen War. Chechen warlord Arbi Barayev is killed.

July
 July – The largest ever recorded outbreak of Legionnaires' disease occurs in Murcia, Spain. 449 cases are confirmed, with more than 800 suspected ones.
 July 2 – The world's first self-contained artificial heart is implanted in Robert Tools in the United States.
 July 4 – Vladivostok Air Flight 352 crashes on approach while landing at Irkutsk Airport, Russia, killing all 145 people aboard.
 July 7 – 2001 Bradford riots: Ethnic violence is provoked in Bradford, England, by the far-right National Front and far-left Anti-Nazi League.
 July 13 – The International Olympic Committee chooses Beijing to host the 2008 Summer Olympics.
 July 14 – Agra Summit: India and Pakistan begin talks to improve relations. The summit ends inconclusively on July 16.
 July 16 – China and Russia sign the 2001 Sino-Russian Treaty of Friendship.

 July 20–22 – The 27th G8 summit takes place in Genoa, Italy. Massive demonstrations, drawing an estimated 200,000 people, are held against the meeting by members of the anti-globalization movement. One demonstrator, Carlo Giuliani, is killed by a policeman, and several others are injured.
 July 23 – Megawati Sukarnoputri is inaugurated as the first female president of Indonesia.
 July 24
 Bandaranaike Airport attack: The Tamil Tigers bomb the Bandaranaike International Airport in Sri Lanka during the Sri Lankan Civil War.
 Simeon Saxe-Coburg-Gotha, deposed as the last Tsar of Bulgaria when a child, is sworn in as the democratically elected 48th Prime Minister of Bulgaria.
 July 26 – Moldova joins the World Trade Organization.
 July 28 – Alejandro Toledo becomes the President of Peru.

August
 August – A ceasefire is negotiated to end the War of the Peters.
 August 2 – The ICTY convicts Bosnian Serb General Radislav Krstić on the charge of genocide for his role in the Srebrenica massacre.
 August 3 – 2001 Kishtwar massacre: 17 Hindus in Kishtwar, Jammu and Kashmir, are killed by Lashkar-e-Taiba militants.
 August 6 – Erwadi fire incident: 28 mentally ill persons bound by chains are burnt to death at a faith-based institution at Erwadi, Tamil Nadu, India.

 August 8
 The Genesis probe is launched from Cape Canaveral Space Launch Complex 17.
 Albanian rebels ambush a convoy of the Army of the Republic of Macedonia near Tetovo, North Macedonia, killing 10 soldiers.
 August 9 – A Sbarro restaurant in Jerusalem is bombed by a Palestinian Hamas terrorist, killing 15 civilians and injuring 130 others.
 August 10
 2001 Angola train attack: 252 people are killed by UNITA in an attack on a train during the Angolan Civil War.
 The United States and the United Kingdom bomb air force installations in Iraq in response to attacks on American and British planes.
 August 13 – Macedonian and Albanian representatives sign the Ohrid Agreement to reduce conflicts during the insurgency.
 August 21 – Operation Essential Harvest: NATO sends a military forces to the Republic of Macedonia in response to the ongoing insurgency.
 August 25 – 2001 Marsh Harbour Cessna 402 crash: Eight People including singer and actress Aaliyah, and several members of her entourage are killed after their overloaded aircraft crashes shortly after takeoff at Marsh Harbour Airport.
 August 28 – A targeted Israeli strike kills PFLP leader Abu Ali Mustafa. Palestinian militants respond by firing on Israeli civilians. Israeli forces occupy Beit Jala, Palestine to combat the militants.
 August 31 – The World Conference against Racism 2001 begins in Durban, South Africa. Israel and the United States withdraw three days later, alleging antisemitism in the conference.

September
 September 1 – Myojo 56 building fire: 44 people are killed in a building fire in Shinjuku, Tokyo, Japan.
 September 2 – 2001 Jakarta train collision: A trail collision in Jakarta, Indonesia kills 31 people.
 September 7 – 2001 Jos riots: Clashes between Christian and Muslim rioters begin in Jos, Nigeria. The conflict will continue until September 17, during which time hundreds of people will be killed.
 September 9
A suicide bomber kills Ahmad Shah Massoud, military commander of the Afghan Northern Alliance.
68 people die of methanol poisoning in Pärnu County, Estonia.

 September 11 – Approximately 2,977 victims are killed or fatally injured in the September 11 attacks after American Airlines Flight 11 and United Airlines Flight 175 are hijacked and crash into the Twin Towers of the World Trade Center, American Airlines Flight 77 is hijacked and crashes into the Pentagon, and United Airlines Flight 93 is hijacked and crashes into grassland in Shanksville, Pennsylvania as a result of passengers fighting to regain control of the airplane. The Twin Towers collapse as a result of the crashes.
 September 18 – The 2001 anthrax attacks begin in the United States, which cause five fatalities and 17 other infections.
 September 19 – Palestinian leader Yasser Arafat forbids Palestinian soldiers from firing on Israeli forces, even in self-defence. Israel agrees to a ceasefire.
 September 20 – In an address to a joint session of Congress, U.S. President George W. Bush declares a war on terror, officially the Global War on Terrorism (GWOT).
 September 21 – Toulouse chemical factory explosion: A fertilizer factory explodes in Toulouse, France, killing 31 people.
September 22 – American spacecraft Deep Space 1 flies within  of Comet Borrelly.
 September 27 – Zug massacre: In Zug, Switzerland, Friedrich Leibacher shoots 18 people, killing 14 of them and then himself.

October
 October 1 
 Jaish-e-Mohammed militants attack the state legislature building in Srinagar, Kashmir, killing 38 people.
 3G wireless technology first becomes available when it is adopted by Japanese telecommunications company NTT Docomo.

 October 2 – Swissair, the national airline of Switzerland, seeks bankruptcy protection and grounds its entire fleet, stranding thousands of people worldwide.
 October 4
 Siberia Airlines Flight 1812 is accidentally shot down by the Ukrainian Air Force over the Black Sea en route from Tel Aviv, Israel, to Novosibirsk, Russia; all 78 people on board are killed.
 2001 Kodori crisis: Fighting escalates between Georgia and the breakaway state Abkhazia.
 October 7 – United States invasion of Afghanistan: In response to the September 11 attacks, Afghanistan is invaded by a US-led coalition, beginning the War in Afghanistan.
 October 8
 Linate Airport disaster: A twin-engine Cessna and Scandinavian Airlines jetliner collide in heavy fog during takeoff from Milan, Italy, killing 118 people.
 Hurricane Iris hits Belize, causing $250 million (2001 USD) in damage.
 October 13 – American scientists create the first successful clone of a human embryo.
 October 15 – NASA's Galileo spacecraft passes within  of Jupiter's moon Io.
 October 16 – American planes misidentify and bomb a Red Cross facility in Afghanistan. A similar error occurs again on October 27.
 October 17 – Assassination of Rehavam Ze'evi: Israeli tourism minister Rehavam Ze'evi is assassinated by the Popular Front for the Liberation of Palestine.
 October 19 – An Indonesian fishing boat, the SIEV X, sinks on route to Christmas Island. 353 people are killed, most of whom are asylum seekers.

 October 23 
 Apple Inc. introduces the iPod, a portable media player and multi-purpose mobile device. The company will sell an estimated 450 million iPod products by May 2022.
 The Provisional Irish Republican Army begins disarmament, ending a decades-long conflict in Northern Ireland.
 October 24 – The 2001 Mars Odyssey arrives at Mars.
 October 25
 Citing connotations with the Rwandan genocide, the government of Rwanda adopts a new national flag for the country.
 Microsoft releases the Windows XP operating system to retail.
 October 30 – The Aarhus Convention takes effect, establishing the right to environmental information and environmental justice for European and Central Asian countries.

November
 November – The World Trade Organization begins the Doha Development Round to negotiate lower trade barriers between countries and integrate developing nations into the global economy.
 November 4 – Hurricane Michelle hits Cuba, where the storm is the strongest tropical cyclone to make landfall on the island in more than 49 years. It is the costliest hurricane in Cuban history to this point with an estimated $2 billion in damage.
 November 7 – Sabena, the national airline of Belgium, goes bankrupt.
 November 10
 2001 Australian federal election: The Coalition government, led by John Howard, is re-elected with a slightly increased majority, defeating the Labor Party led by Kim Beazley.
 Fall of Mazar-i-Sharif: American and Northern Alliance forces take Mazar-i-Sharif in the first major offensive of the War in Afghanistan.
 November 11 – Two French journalists, Pierre Billaud and Johanne Sutton, and a German colleague, Volker Handloik, are killed in Afghanistan during an attack on their convoy.
 November 12
 American Airlines Flight 587 crashes in Queens, New York City, minutes after takeoff from John F. Kennedy International Airport, killing all 260 people on board.
 2001 uprising in Herat: Northern Alliance forces take the city of Herat from the Taliban.
 November 14 
 Fall of Kabul: Northern Alliance forces take the Afghan capital Kabul.
 A 7.8-magnitude earthquake strikes China with an epicenter near Kokoxili, but it occurs in a sparsely populated mountainous region and there are no casualties.
 November 15 – Microsoft enters the gaming console market with the release of the Xbox, a sixth-generation gaming console, in the United States.
 November 18 – The Leonids meteor shower occurs in its heaviest concentration in decades as Earth passes through a debris cloud.
 November 23 – The Convention on Cybercrime, the first international treaty to address cybercrime, is signed in Budapest, Hungary.

 November 27 – A hydrogen atmosphere is discovered on the extrasolar planet HD 209458 b, nicknamed Osiris, by the Hubble Space Telescope. It is the first atmosphere detected on an extrasolar planet.

December
 December – Dasht-i-Leili massacre: Hundreds of Taliban prisoners are killed by the forces of Abdul Rashid Dostum.
 December 1
 The International Commission on Intervention and State Sovereignty produces a report on responsibility to protect.
 A series of bombings in Zion Square are carried out by Hamas. Ten people are killed and hundreds more are injured.
 December 2
 Enron files for Chapter 11 bankruptcy protection five days after Dynegy cancels a US$8.4 billion buyout bid (to this point, the largest bankruptcy in U.S. history).
 Haifa bus 16 suicide bombing: A Hamas militant carries out a suicide bombing in Haifa, Israel, killing 15 people.
 December 3 – The Segway, a self-balancing personal transporter invented by Dean Kamen, is unveiled after months of public speculation and media hype on the ABC News morning program Good Morning America.
 December 5 – 2001 Sayyd Alma Kalay airstrike: An American airstrike mistakenly targets a friendly position, killing 11 people in a friendly fire incident.
 December 6 – Fall of Kandahar: The Taliban surrenders in Kandahar, its final stronghold.
 December 8 – An ebola outbreak is confirmed in Gabon.
 December 11 – China joins the World Trade Organization.
 December 13
 2001 Indian Parliament attack: Nine people and five terrorists are killed in a terrorist attack in New Delhi, leading to the 2001–2002 India–Pakistan standoff.
 U.S. President George W. Bush announces the American withdrawal from the 1972 Anti-Ballistic Missile Treaty.
 Sirajuddin of Perlis becomes the Yang di-Pertuan Agong, the constitutional monarch and head of state of Malaysia.
 December 15 – The Leaning Tower of Pisa is reopened to the public after 12 years of reconstruction.
 December 17 – Battle of Tora Bora: American forces take Tora Bora, a cave complex and the headquarters of Al-Qaeda in Afghanistan. Al-Qaeda leader Osama bin Laden escapes during the battle and goes into hiding.
 December 19 – A record-high barometric pressure of 1085.6 hPa (32.06 inHg) is recorded at Tosontsengel, Zavkhan, Mongolia.
 December 21 – President Fernando de la Rúa of Argentina resigns in response to the riots against Argentina's economic crisis.

 December 22
 Battle of Amami-Ōshima: A Japan Coast Guard ship and an armed North Korean vessel engage in conflict near the Japanese island of Amami Ōshima, in the East China Sea. The encounter ends in the sinking of the North Korean vessel that is later determined to have been a spy craft by the Japanese authorities.
 Burhanuddin Rabbani, political leader of the Northern Alliance, hands over power in Afghanistan to the interim government headed by President Hamid Karzai.
 December 24 – The Constitution of the Comoros is amended, creating a federal government with a rotating presidency and granting increased autonomy to the three island administrations.
 December 25 – Ketanggungan Barat railway collision: A trail collision at Ketanggungan Barat railway station kills 42 people in Indonesia.
 December 27
 China is granted permanent normal trade status with the United States.
 Tropical Storm Vamei forms within 1.5 degrees of the equator. No other tropical cyclone in recorded history has come as close to the equator.
 December 29 – Mesa Redonda fire: A fire occurs in a shopping center in Lima, Peru, following a fireworks accident, killing at least 291 people.

Births

January–April
 
 January 1 – Angourie Rice, Australian actress
 January 3 – Deni Avdija, Israeli basketball player 
 January 5 – Mykhailo Mudryk, Ukrainian footballer
 January 9 
 Eric García, Spanish footballer
 Rodrygo, Brazilian footballer
 January 15 
 Alexandra Agiurgiuculese, Romanian-Italian rhythmic gymnast
 Charline Schwarz, German archer
 January 17 – Enzo Fernández, Argentine footballer
 January 25 – Michela Pace, Maltese singer
 February 12 – Khvicha Kvaratskhelia, Georgian footballer
 February 13 – Kaapo Kakko, Finnish ice hockey player
 February 23 – Rinky Hijikata, Australian tennis player
 February 19 – David Mazouz, American actor
 February 24 
 Ramona Marquez, British actress
 An San, South Korean archer
 March 4 – Freya Anderson, English freestyle swimmer
 March 21 – Varvara Subbotina, Russian synchronised swimmer
 April 6 – Oscar Piastri, Australian racing driver
 April 20 – Noa Kirel, Israeli singer
 April 26 – Thiago Almada, Argentine footballer

May–August

 May 8 – Jordyn Huitema, Canadian soccer player
 May 29 – Maryna Aleksiyiva, Ukrainian synchronised swimmer
 May 31 – Iga Świątek, Polish tennis player
 June 4 
 Jacob Krop, Kenyan middle distance runner
 Takefusa Kubo, Japanese footballer
 June 12 – Théo Maledon, French basketball player
 July 10 – Isabela Moner, American actress and singer
 August 12 – Dixie D'Amelio, American social media personality
 August 16 – Jannik Sinner, Italian tennis player
 August 22 – LaMelo Ball, American basketball player

September–December

 September 3 – Kaia Gerber, American model and actress
 September 5 – Bukayo Saka, English footballer
 September 6 – Freya Allan, English actress
 September 14 – Elena Mikhaylichenko, Russian handball player
 September 25 – Cade Cunningham, American basketball player
 October 1 – Mason Greenwood, English footballer
 October 7 – Princess Senate Seeiso, princess of Lesotho
 October 13 – Caleb McLaughlin, American actor
 October 14 – Rowan Blanchard, American actress
 October 25 – Princess Elisabeth, Duchess of Brabant, daughter and Heiress Apparent of Philippe, King of the Belgians
 November 8 – Avani Lekhara, Indian Paralympian and rifle shooter
 December 1 – Aiko, Princess Toshi of Japan
 December 1 – Oscar Chelimo, Ugandan long distance runner
 December 18 – Billie Eilish, American singer
 December 28 – Maitreyi Ramakrishnan, Canadian actress

Deaths

January

 January 1 – Ray Walston, American actor (b. 1914)
 January 2 – William P. Rogers, American politician and diplomat (b. 1913)
 January 7 – Charles Helou, 9th president of Lebanon (b. 1913)
 January 9 – Paul Vanden Boeynants, 2-time prime minister of Belgium (b. 1919)
 January 12
 Adhemar da Silva, Brazilian athlete (b. 1927)
 Bill Hewlett, American businessman (b. 1913)
 January 18 – Laurent-Désiré Kabila, president of the Democratic Republic of the Congo (b. 1939) (see assassination of Laurent-Désiré Kabila)
 January 27 – Marie-José of Belgium, last Queen of Italy (b. 1906)
 January 31 – Gordon R. Dickson, Canadian writer (b. 1923)

February

 February 4 
 J. J. Johnson, American jazz trombonist (b. 1924)
 Iannis Xenakis, Greek composer (b. 1922)
 February 6 – Trần Văn Lắm, South Vietnamese diplomat and politician (b. 1913)
 February 7 – Dale Evans, American actress, singer, and songwriter (b. 1912)
 February 9 – Herbert A. Simon, American economist, Nobel Prize laureate (b. 1916)
 February 10 – Lewis Arquette, American film actor, writer and producer (b. 1935)
 February 13 – Ugo Fano, Italian-born American physicist (b. 1912)
 February 18
 Balthus, French painter (b. 1908)
 Dale Earnhardt, American auto racing driver (b. 1951) (see Death of Dale Earnhardt)
 February 19 
 Stanley Kramer, American film director (b. 1913)
 Charles Trenet French singer and songwriter (b. 1913)
 February 20 – Rosemary DeCamp, American actress (b. 1910)
 February 24 – Claude Shannon, American mathematician (b. 1916)
 February 25 – Sir Don Bradman, Australian cricketer (b. 1908)

March

 March 10 – Michael Woodruff, British surgeon and organ transplantation pioneer (b. 1911)
 March 12 – Robert Ludlum, American author (b. 1927)
 March 15 – Ann Sothern, American actress and singer (b. 1909)
 March 18 – John Phillips, American singer-songwriter (b. 1935)
 March 20 – Ilie Verdeț, 51st prime minister of Romania (b. 1925)
 March 22 – William Hanna, American animator and businessman (b. 1910)
 March 29 – John Lewis, American jazz pianist and composer (b. 1920)
 March 31 – Clifford Shull, American physicist, Nobel Prize laureate (b. 1915)

April

 April 2 – Jennifer Syme, American actress (b. 1972)
 April 7
 David Graf, American actor (b. 1950)
 Beatrice Straight, American actress (b. 1914)
 April 11 – Sir Harry Secombe, Welsh entertainer (b. 1921)
 April 14 – Hiroshi Teshigahara, Japanese director (b. 1927)
 April 15 – Joey Ramone, American musician and singer (b. 1951)
 April 20
 Va'ai Kolone, Prime Minister of Samoa (b. 1911)
 Giuseppe Sinopoli, Italian conductor and composer (b. 1946)
 April 25 – Michele Alboreto, Italian racing driver (b. 1956)
 April 29 – Barend Biesheuvel, Prime Minister of the Netherlands (1971–1973) (b. 1920)

May

 May 11 – Douglas Adams, English author (b. 1952)
 May 12 
 Perry Como, American singer (b. 1912)
 Didi, Brazilian footballer (b. 1928)
 May 13 
 Jason Miller, American actor and playwright (b. 1939)
 R. K. Narayan, Indian novelist (b. 1906)
 May 17 – Jacques-Louis Lions, French mathematician (b. 1928)
 May 22 – Jenő Fock, 49th prime minister of Hungary (b. 1916)
 May 24 – Javier Urruticoechea, Spanish footballer (b. 1952)
 May 26 – Anne Haney, American actress (b. 1934)
 May 31 – Arlene Francis, American actress and game show panelist (b. 1907)

June

 June 1
 Nkosi Johnson, South African AIDS awareness campaigner (b. 1989)
 Nepalese royal massacre:
 Queen Aishwarya of Nepal (b. 1949) 
 King Birendra of Nepal (b. 1944) 
 Prince Nirajan of Nepal (b. 1978)
 Princess Shruti of Nepal (b. 1976)
 June 2 – Imogene Coca, American actress (b. 1908)
 June 3 – Anthony Quinn, Mexican-American actor (b. 1915)
 June 4 – King Dipendra of Nepal (b. 1971)
 June 7 – Víctor Paz Estenssoro, 45th President of Bolivia (b. 1907)
 June 10 – Leila Pahlavi, Iranian princess (b. 1970)
 June 11 
 Timothy McVeigh, American terrorist (b. 1968)
 Amalia Mendoza, Mexican singer and actress (b. 1923)
 June 15 – Henri Alekan, French cinematographer (b. 1909)
 June 17 – Donald J. Cram, American chemist, Nobel Prize laureate (b. 1919)
 June 21
 John Lee Hooker, American musician (b. 1917)
 Soad Hosny, Egyptian actress (b. 1942)
 Carroll O'Connor, American actor (b. 1924)
 June 22 – Luis Carniglia, Argentine footballer and manager (b. 1917)
 June 23 – Corinne Calvet, French actress (b. 1925)
 June 27
 Tove Jansson, Finnish author and illustrator (b. 1914)
 Jack Lemmon, American actor and director (b. 1925)
 Joan Sims, English actress (b. 1930)
 June 28 – Mortimer J. Adler, American philosopher (b. 1902)
 June 29 – Maximos V Hakim, Egyptian patriarch (b. 1908)
 June 30 
 Chet Atkins, American guitarist and record producer (b. 1924)
 Joe Fagan, English footballer and manager (b. 1921)
 Joe Henderson, American jazz tenor saxophonist (b. 1937)

July

 July 1 – Nikolay Basov, Soviet physicist, Nobel Prize laureate (b. 1922)
 July 10 – Álvaro Magaña, 38th President of El Salvador (b. 1925)
 July 11 – Herman Brood, Dutch musician (b. 1946)
 July 17 – Katharine Graham, American publisher (b. 1917)
 July 21 – Sivaji Ganesan, Indian actor (b. 1928)
 July 22 – Maria Gorokhovskaya, Soviet gymnast (b. 1921)
 July 25 – Josef Klaus, 16th Chancellor of Austria (b. 1910)
 July 28 – Ahmed Sofa, Bengali writer (b. 1943)
 July 29 – Edward Gierek, Polish politician (b. 1913)
 July 31
 Poul Anderson, American author (b. 1926)
 Francisco da Costa Gomes, 15th President of Portugal (b. 1914)

August

 August 4 – Lorenzo Music, American actor, writer, producer, and musician (b. 1937)
 August 6
 Larry Adler, American musician (b. 1914)
 Jorge Amado, Brazilian writer (b. 1912)
 Dương Văn Minh, 4th and final President of the Republic of Vietnam (South Vietnam) (b. 1916)
 Wilhelm Mohnke, German general (b. 1911)
 August 15 – Richard Chelimo, Kenyan athlete (b. 1972)
 August 19 – Donald Woods, South African journalist and anti-apartheid activist (b. 1933)
 August 20 
 Fred Hoyle, British astronomer and writer (b. 1915)
 Kim Stanley, American actress (b. 1925)
 August 23 – Kathleen Freeman, American actress (b. 1919)
 August 24 – Jane Greer, American actress (b. 1924)
 August 25 – Aaliyah, American singer and actress (b. 1979) (see 2001 Marsh Harbour Cessna 402 crash)
 August 26 – Marita Petersen, 8th prime minister of Faroe Islands (b. 1940)
 August 27 – Abu Ali Mustafa, Palestinian militant leader (b. 1938)
 August 30 – A. F. M. Ahsanuddin Chowdhury, 9th president of Bangladesh (b. 1915)

September

 September 2
 Christiaan Barnard, South African cardiac surgeon (b. 1922)
 Troy Donahue, American actor (b. 1936)
 September 3
 Pauline Kael, American film critic (b. 1919)
 Thuy Trang, Vietnamese American actress (b. 1973)
 September 9 – Ahmad Shah Massoud, Afghan military commander (b. 1953)
 September 11 – 2,996 people (2,977 victims and 19 hijackers) who died in the September 11 attacks (see Casualties of the September 11 attacks)
 September 12 – Victor Wong, Chinese-American actor (b. 1927)
 September 13 – Jaroslav Drobný, Czechoslovakian-Egyptian-British tennis player (b. 1921)
 September 14 – Dorothy McGuire, American actress (b. 1916)
 September 20 – Marcos Pérez Jiménez, 51st President of Venezuela (b. 1914)
 September 22 – Isaac Stern, Ukrainian violinist (b. 1920)
 September 29
 Gloria Foster, American actress (b. 1933)
 Nguyễn Văn Thiệu, 2nd President of the Republic of Vietnam (South Vietnam) (b. 1923)

October

 October 8 – Javed Iqbal, Pakistani serial killer (b. 1956)
 October 9 – Herbert Ross, American actor, choreographer, director, and producer (b. 1927)
 October 15 – Chang Hsueh-liang, Chinese military figure (b. 1901)
 October 17 
 Micheline Ostermeyer, French athlete (b. 1922)
 Rehavam Ze'evi, Israeli general and politician (b. 1926) (see assassination of Rehavam Ze'evi)
 October 21 – Bertie Mee, English football player and coach (b. 1918)
 October 22 – Georgy Vitsin, Soviet and Russian actor (b. 1917)
 October 24 – Jaromil Jireš, Czechoslovak filmmaker (b. 1935)
 October 25 – Soraya Esfandiary-Bakhtiary, Queen consort of Iran (b. 1932)

November

 November
 Mohammed Atef, Al-Qaeda leader (b. 1944)
 Ravindra Kaushik, Indian spy (b. 1952)
 November 1 – Juan Bosch, President of the Dominican Republic (b. 1909)
 November 3 – Sir Ernst Gombrich, Austrian-born art historian (b. 1909) 
 November 5 – Gholam Reza Azhari, 73rd prime minister of Iran (b. 1912)
 November 6 – Anthony Shaffer, English novelist and playwright (b. 1926)
 November 9 – Giovanni Leone, 37th Prime Minister of Italy and 6th President of Italy (b. 1908)
 November 10 – Ken Kesey, American author (b. 1935)
 November 12 – Satguru Sivaya Subramuniyaswami, American-born Hindu guru (b. 1927)
 November 14 – Juan Carlos Lorenzo, Argentine footballer and coach (b. 1922)
 November 24
 Sophie, Princess of Greece and Denmark (b. 1914)
 Melanie Thornton, American singer (b. 1967) (see Crossair Flight 3597)
 November 29 – George Harrison, English musician (b. 1943)

December

 December – Kira Ivanova, Soviet–Russian figure skater (b. 1963)
 December 5 – Sir Peter Blake, New Zealand yachtsman (b. 1948)
 December 8 – Betty Holberton, American computer scientist (b. 1917)
 December 10 – Ashok Kumar, Indian actor (b. 1911)
 December 12 – Josef Bican, Czech–Austrian footballer (b. 1913)
 December 13 – Rufus Thomas, American singer (b. 1917)
 December 18 – Gilbert Bécaud, French singer-songwriter (b. 1927)
 December 20 – Léopold Sédar Senghor, first president of Senegal (b. 1906)
 December 23 – Jelle Zijlstra, Dutch politician and economist, Prime Minister of the Netherlands (b. 1918)
 December 26 – Sir Nigel Hawthorne, British actor (b. 1929)
 December 31
 John Grigg, British writer (b. 1924)
 Eileen Heckart, American actress (b. 1919)
 Harshad Mehta, Indian stockbroker (b. 1954)

Nobel Prizes

 Physics – Eric Allin Cornell, Wolfgang Ketterle, and Carl Wieman
 Chemistry – William Standish Knowles, Ryōji Noyori, and Karl Barry Sharpless
 Medicine – Leland H. Hartwell, Tim Hunt, and Paul Nurse
 Literature – V. S. Naipaul
 Peace – United Nations, Kofi Annan
 Bank of Sweden Prize in Economic Sciences in Memory of Alfred Nobel – George Akerlof, Michael Spence, and Joseph Stiglitz

See also 

 Dot-com bubble
 Early 2000s recession
 List of earthquakes in 2001
 Tropical cyclones in 2001

References

Further reading
 
 "Review: The Year Everything Changed: 2001 by Phillipa McGuinness by Miriam Cosic, The Australian, June 9, 2018

External links

 2001 – The Year in Review, Financial Times